The Czechoslovakia national rugby union team was the national rugby team of Czechoslovakia, before the country was split into the Czech Republic and Slovakia. They participated in qualifiers for the 1991 Rugby World Cup, but did not qualify.

History
A Czechoslovak international team including players from an Austrian club called Wiener Amateure as well as players from the Slavia Bratislava club first played against Romania in 1927, but the match is seen as unofficial, since the Czechoslovak Rugby Union was only formed in 1928. They were captained by one František Ruber, who incidentally was a very good friend of Ondřej Sekora. Their first official match was against Germany in Leipzig in 1931.

In 1934 they were among the founding members of FIRA (as it was then known) along with France, Italy, Spain, Catalonia, Romania and Germany.

In 1956 they took on European giants France in Toulouse, losing by a respectable 3–28, which is rather remarkable, as rugby in Czechoslovakia was considerably ravaged by World War II.

Some of their most notable players were Zdeněk Barchánek, Eduard Krützner, who was president of the Czech Rugby Union later on and Bruno Kudrna, Czech Rugby Player of the Year a record six times.

See also
 Czech Republic
 Rugby union in the Czech Republic
 Czech Republic national rugby union team
 Czech Republic women's national rugby union team
 Czech Republic national rugby union team (sevens)
 Czech Rugby Union
 Slovakia
 Rugby union in Slovakia
 Slovakia national rugby union team

References

European national rugby union teams
Rugby union in Czechoslovakia
Former national rugby union teams
National sports teams of Czechoslovakia